The Josephine Ulrick Poetry Prize is an award given to Australian poets for a single poem. The initial prize was awarded at the Somerset Celebration of Literature literary dinner in Surfers Paradise, Queensland, Australia in March 1998. The prize was created by Win Schubert, Director of Art Galleries Schubert at the Gold Coast, in celebration of the dynamic life of her gallery manager and close friend, Josephine Ulrick. From 1998 until 2000, the Prize was managed by the Somerset Celebration of Literature, then from 2001 to 2003 it moved to the University of Queensland, Ulrick being a former student of that university. It then became a part of the Creative Writing program at Griffith University, Gold Coast, in Queensland. Starting in 2013, the Arts, Education and Law Group at Griffith University funded the award fully, and the name was changed to the Griffith University Josephine Ulrick Poetry Prize.

Winners 
Winners of the Josephine Ulrick Poetry Prize (1998–2012) and the Griffith University Josephine Ulrick Poetry Prize (2013–2016):

Slattery's awards were revoked after the discovery of widespread plagiarism.

References

Further reading
 Rigney, Virginia & Nigel Krauth (eds) 2015 Prizing Diversity: The Josephine Ulrick Prizes 1998-2014, Thames & Hudson, Port Melbourne

Australian poetry awards
Griffith University
Awards established in 1998
Awards disestablished in 2016
Australian literature-related lists